C. N. Bhaskarappa is an Indian politician, elected to the Lok Sabha, the lower house of the Parliament of India as a member of the Janata Dal.

References

External links
Official biographical sketch in Parliament of India website

1942 births
Living people
India MPs 1996–1997
Lok Sabha members from Karnataka